Uncle Tom's Uncle is a 1926 American short silent comedy film directed by Robert F. McGowan. It was the 50th Our Gang short subject released.

Cast

The Gang
 Joe Cobb as Joe / Uncle Tom
 Jackie Condon as Jackie
 Mickey Daniels as Mickey / Simon Legree
 Johnny Downs as Johnny / Marks the Lawyer
 Allen Hoskins as Farina / Topsy
 Mary Kornman as Mary / Little Eva
 Bobby Young as Bonedust
 Jay R. Smith as Jay
 Jannie Hoskins as Mango
 Nancy McKee as Nancy
 David Durand as Piano player
 Pal the Dog as Pal
 Buster the Dog as Buster

Additional cast
 Peggy Eames as Audience member laughing
 Gabe Saienz - Tough kid in the audience
 Bobby Green - Audience member
 Jackie Hanes - Audience member
 Billy Naylor - Audience member
 Billy Butts as Undetermined role
 Scooter Lowry - Undetermined role
 Bobby Mallon - Undetermined role

See also
 Our Gang filmography

References

External links

1926 short films
1926 films
American black-and-white films
American silent short films
Films directed by Robert F. McGowan
Hal Roach Studios short films
Our Gang films
1926 comedy films
1920s American films
Silent American comedy films
1920s English-language films